"Barbarella" is the only official single released from Scott Weiland's 1998 debut album 12 Bar Blues. The song is titled after the sci-fi film Barbarella, while the lyrics of the song pay homage to several science fiction television shows and movies.

Music video
The song's music video used themes from the David Bowie film The Man Who Fell to Earth.

Chart performance
The song charted on the Billboard Modern Rock Tracks and remained there for three weeks, peaking at number 36.

Personnel
Tony Castaneda - Guitar
Tracy Chisholm - Producer
Peter DiStefano - Guitar, Ethereal Guitar, Bass
Mark Howard - Mixing
Victor Indrizzo - Hi-hat Cymbal
Daniel Lanois - Guitar, Producer, Mixing
Martyn LeNoble - Bass
Holly Reiger - Guitar
Michael Weiland - Acoustic Drum Loop
Scott Weiland - Vocals, Human Beatbox, Piano, Synthesizer, Percussion, Additional Guitars, Producer

References

Songs about fictional female characters
1998 singles
Scott Weiland songs
Songs written by Scott Weiland
Music videos directed by Jonathan Dayton and Valerie Faris
1998 songs
Atlantic Records singles